Clyde Ballard (born June 8, 1936) is an American businessman and former politician from Washington. Ballard is a former Republican member of the Washington House of Representatives, representing the 12th district from 1983 to 2003.

Career 
Ballard is a former General Manager in a grocery store.

On August 1, 1967, Ballard and Ruth Ballard founded Ballard Ambulance in Washington.

On November 2, 1982, Ballard won the election and became a Republican member of the Washington House of Representatives for District 12, Position 1. Ballard defeated Howard D. Pryor and Henry (Fritz) Halla with 60.65% of the votes.

In 1986, Ballard sold Ballard Ambulance to his sons.

In leadership, he served as Republican Caucus-Chair from 1985 to 1986, as House Minority Leader from 1987 to 1995 and as Speaker of the House from 1995 to 1999. Between 1999 and 2002, no party in the Washington House of Representative held a majority. During this time, Ballard served as Co-Speaker of the House alongside Frank Chopp.

In 2003, Ballard retired as a member of Washington House of Representatives.

Awards 
 2018 Washington State Apple Blossom Grand Marshal.

Personal life 
At age 18, Ballard married Ruth. They have three sons and two foster daughters. Ballard and his family live in East Wenatchee, Washington.

References

External links 
 Clyde Ballard at ourcampaigns.com
 Clyde Ballard at historylink.org
 Ballard Ambulance
 Ballard-Thompson Award at washingtoncog.org

Additional sources 
 Who's who in the West at google.com, 2004, isbn 9780837909356

1936 births
Living people
People from Batesville, Arkansas
People from East Wenatchee, Washington
Speakers of the Washington House of Representatives
Republican Party members of the Washington House of Representatives